Pinewood School may refer to:
Pinewood School, Los Altos, California, USA
Pinewood School, Bourton, Bourton, Vale of White Horse, Oxfordshire, England
Pinewood Preparatory School, Summerville, South Carolina, USA